Yaqub al-Ghussein (1899-1948) was a Palestinian landowner from Ramla and founder of the Youth Congress Party. He graduated in law from the University of Cambridge. Ghussein was elected president of the first National Congress of Arab Youth, held in Jaffa in January 1932. He was a member and representative of his party in the Arab Higher Committee from its formation in 1936. In 1937 he was a member of the Supreme Muslim Council. On 1 October of the same year he was exiled by the British to the Seychelles Islands for being a member of the Arab Higher Committee, which was outlawed by the British on 27 September 1937, following the assassination of the Acting British District Commissioner of Galilee, Lewis Yelland Andrews.

He was a member of the Palestinian delegation to the London Conference at St. James's Palace in February 1939.

Ghussein reconstituted his faction in 1945. He died in Jerusalem on 27 December 1948.

References
Levenberg, Haim (1993). Military Preparations of the Arab Community in Palestine: 1945-1948. London: Routledge. 

Ghussein, Yaqub al-
Ghussein, Yaqub al-
G
People from Ramla